Michael Heltau (born 5 July 1933) is a German actor and singer. He was born in Ingolstadt, Germany, and now lives in Austria.

Selected filmography 
 Hubertus Castle (1954)
 The Last Man (1955)
 Engagement at Wolfgangsee (1956)
 Lemke's Widow (1957)
 Panoptikum 59 (1959)
  (1973)

Television appearances
Maximilian von Mexiko (1970)
Manolescu – Die fast wahre Biographie eines Gauners (1972)
Mino (1986)
Inspecteur derrick (1997)

Decorations and awards
 1970/1971: Karl Skraup Prize
 1974: Josef Kainz Medal
 1976: Golden Rathausmann
 1985: Gold Honorary Medal of Vienna
 1986: Kammerschauspieler
 1993: Doyen of the Burgtheater
 2000: Austrian Cross of Honour for Science and Art, 1st class
 2003: Honorary Membership of the Burgtheater
 2004: Honorary Membership of the Volksoper
 2005: Gold Medal for services to the City of Vienna
 26 November 2005: Nestroy Theatre Prize
 2006: Merit Cross 1st Class of the Federal Republic of Germany
 2008 "Golden Mozart Ring" of the Mozartgemeinde of Vienna
 20 October 2010: Burgtheater Ring of Honour

References

External links 
 
 Short Biography 
 Official Homepage 

People from Ingolstadt
1933 births
Living people
Austrian male film actors
Austrian male television actors
German male film actors
German male television actors
20th-century Austrian male actors
20th-century German male actors
Wienerlied
Austrian people of German descent
Recipients of the Austrian Cross of Honour for Science and Art, 1st class
Officers Crosses of the Order of Merit of the Federal Republic of Germany